The 1947 Paris–Tours was the 41st edition of the Paris–Tours cycle race and was held on 4 May 1947. The race started in Paris and finished in Tours. The race was won by Briek Schotte.

General classification

References

1947 in French sport
1947
May 1947 sports events in Europe